Haoua Kessely (born 2 February 1988 in Mantes-la-Jolie, France) is a French athlete who specialises in the triple jump. Kessely competed at the 31st 2011 European Athletics Indoor Championships.

Biography 
Haoua has won six French national Indoor Athletic Championships: five in the Long Jump  
in 2009, 2011, 2012, 2015 and 2016, and one in the triple jump in 2011.

In 2015 at Villeneuve-d'Ascq, she won her first Output Long Jump title with 
a jump of 6.13m.

Prizes 
French Outdoor National Athletic Championships :
 gold medal for Long Jump in 2015 and  2016
French Indoor National Athletic Championships :
 gold medal for Long Jump in 2009, 2011, 2012, 2015 and 2016
 gold medal in Triple Jump 2011

References

External links
 
 
 

1988 births
Living people
People from Mantes-la-Jolie
French female triple jumpers
French female long jumpers
Sportspeople from Yvelines